The 2020 Asian-Pacific Judo Championships was a Judo event expected to take place in Ulaanbaatar, Mongolia. The championships were originally scheduled to take place from 17 to 19 April, then from 26 to 29 November, but were postponed both times due to the COVID-19 pandemic.  The event was eventually cancelled.

References

External links
 

2020
2020
Asian Championships
2020
Judo
Asian 2020
Asian-Pacific Judo Championships
International sports competitions hosted by Mongolia
Asian-Pacific Judo Chapionships
Sports events cancelled due to the COVID-19 pandemic